Rahis Nabi (born 15 April 1999) is a footballer who currently plays as a midfielder for Redditch Utd. Born in England, he represents Pakistan internationally.

Family
Rahis Nabi is the younger brother of Samir Nabi and Adil Nabi, both of whom are also footballers and were at West Bromwich Albion's academy.

Club career
Nabi played youth football for West Bromwich Albion, and scored in a single youth game for Sunderland on 8 April 2017. In July 2017, after leaving West Brom, he signed a one-year deal at Burnley's Development Squad. 
On July 27, 2021 Rahis signed for Redditch Utd.

Nabi later played senior football for Alvechurch of the Southern Football League Central Division (seventh tier).
On July 27, 2021 Rahis signed for Redditch Utd.

International 
As a junior, he was a member of the England Under-17 squad.

On senior level, he agreed to represent Pakistan national football team and made his debut on 6 June 2019 in a 2022 FIFA World Cup qualifier against Cambodia, as a starter. Rahis and his brother Samir joined the camp at Bahrain for training practice. Rahis and Samir impressed Pakistan team officials.

Career statistics

Club

International

References

External links

1999 births
Living people
Footballers from Birmingham, West Midlands
Pakistani footballers
Pakistan international footballers
English footballers
England youth international footballers
English people of Pakistani descent
British sportspeople of Pakistani descent
British Asian footballers
Alvechurch F.C. players
Association football midfielders
Southern Football League players